Suburb (Spanish: Suburbio) is a 1951 Argentine drama film directed by León Klimovsky and starring Pedro López Lagar, Fanny Navarro and Zoe Ducós. The film portrays life in one of the poorer neighborhoods of Buenos Aires. Under pressure from the Peronist authorities, Klimovsky changed the ending to suggest that the problems of such communities were now a thing of the past.

Cast
In alphabetical order
 Juan Alighieri 
 Leo Alza 
 Arturo Arcari 
 Graciliano Batista 
 Olga Berg 
 Félix Camino
 Rosa Catá 
 Margarita Corona
 Alberto de Mendoza 
 Zoe Ducos 
 Roberto Durán
 Mauricio Espósito 
 Roberto Guthie 
 Angélica López Gamio 
 Pedro López Lagar 
 Pedro Maratea
 José Maurer 
 Fernanda Mistral 
 Yuki Nambá 
 Fanny Navarro 
 Juan Pecci
 Fernando Siro 
 Enrique Thomas 
 Aldo Vega

References

Bibliography 
 Michael Pigott & Santiago Oyarzabel. World Film Locations: Buenos Aires. Intellect Ltd, 2014.

External links 
 

1951 films
Argentine drama films
1951 drama films
1950s Spanish-language films
Films directed by León Klimovsky
Films set in Buenos Aires
Films shot in Buenos Aires
Films scored by Julián Bautista
Argentine black-and-white films
1950s Argentine films